Paul George Cullen (13 July 1882 – 18 June 1950) was an Australian rules footballer who played with South Melbourne in the Victorian Football League (VFL).

Notes

External links 

1882 births
1950 deaths
Australian rules footballers from Victoria (Australia)
Sydney Swans players
People from Ararat, Victoria